"Out of My Mind" is a song by Dutch dance duo Bingo Players. It was written and produced by Maarten Hoogstraten, Paul Bäumer and H&K. It was released in the Netherlands as a digital download on 12 November 2012. The song has charted in Belgium.

Track listing

Chart performance

Release history

References

2012 singles
Bingo Players songs
Songs written by Maarten Hoogstraten
Songs written by Paul Bäumer (musician)
2012 songs
Spinnin' Records singles